Jair Messias Bolsonaro (born 21 March 1955) is a Brazilian politician and retired military officer who served as the 38th president of Brazil from 2019 until 2022. He was elected in 2018 as a member of the Social Liberal Party, which he turned into a conservative party before cutting ties with it. In 2021, he joined the conservative Liberal Party. From 1991 to 2018, Bolsonaro served in Brazil's Chamber of Deputies, representing the state of Rio de Janeiro.

Bolsonaro was born in Glicério, in the state of São Paulo. He graduated from the Agulhas Negras Military Academy in 1977 and served in the Brazilian Army's field artillery and parachutist units. He became known to the public in 1986, when he wrote an article for Veja magazine criticizing low wages for military officers, after which he was arrested and detained for 15 days. A year later, the same magazine accused him of planning to plant bombs in military units, which he denied. A lower court convicted him, but the  acquitted him in 1988. He moved to the reserve in 1988 with the rank of captain and ran for the Rio de Janeiro City Council that year, elected as a member of the Christian Democratic Party. In 1990, Bolsonaro was elected to the lower chamber of Congress and he was reelected six times. During his 27-year tenure as a congressman, he became known for his national conservatism. He is a vocal opponent of same-sex marriage, abortion, affirmative action, drug liberalization, and secularism. In foreign policy, he has advocated closer relations to the United States and Israel. During the 2018 Brazilian general election campaign, he started to advocate economically liberal and pro-market policies. A polarizing and controversial politician, his views and comments, which have been described as far-right and populist, have drawn both praise and criticism in Brazil.

Bolsonaro announced his candidacy for president in March 2016 as a member of the Social Christian Party. He left the party in 2018 and joined the Social Liberal Party, and then launched his presidential campaign in August that year, with retired general Hamilton Mourão as his running mate. He portrayed himself as an outsider and a supporter of family values. He came in first place in the first round of the general election on 7October 2018, with Workers' Party candidate Fernando Haddad coming in second. The two candidates had a runoff on 28 October 2018, and Bolsonaro was elected with 55.1% of the popular vote.

Bolsonaro placed many army officers in key positions in his cabinet. Before his inauguration, he said he would fill positions in his government based only on technical qualifications and skills rather than ideological sympathy. During his presidency, many appointees have clashed ideologically with the government. His ministers of Justice and Education, the Secretary of Government, the head of the postal service and other government officials fell out of favor with Bolsonaro and resigned. He focused on domestic affairs in his first months in office, dealing primarily with the fallout of the 2014 Brazilian economic crisis. During his first year in office, the economy recovered slowly, while crime rates fell sharply. In 2019, Bolsonaro left the Social Liberal Party amid a confrontation with other members and attempted to form the Alliance for Brazil party, before joining the Liberal Party to run for the 2022 Brazilian general election. During his presidency, he rolled back protections for Indigenous groups in the Amazon rainforest and facilitated its deforestation. Bolsonaro's response to the COVID-19 pandemic in Brazil was criticized across the political spectrum after he sought to downplay the pandemic and its effects, opposed quarantine measures, and dismissed two health ministers, while the death toll increased rapidly.

On 30 October 2022, in the runoff of the 2022 Brazilian general election, Bolsonaro lost to Luiz Inácio Lula da Silva, becoming the first president in Brazil to lose his bid for re-election. On 8 January 2023, his supporters stormed the nation's highest institutions, including Congress, calling for a coup d'état.  Bolsonaro eventually condemned the protesters and denied responsibility.

Early life 

Bolsonaro was born on 21 March 1955 in Glicério, São Paulo, in southeast Brazil, to Percy Geraldo Bolsonaro and Olinda Bonturi. His family is mostly of Italian descent, with German ancestry as well. On his father's side, he is the great-grandson of Italians from Veneto and Calabria. Bolsonaro's paternal grandfather's family comes from Veneto, more precisely Anguillara Veneta, in the province of Padua. His great-grandfather, Vittorio Bolzonaro (the surname was originally written with a "z"), was born on 12 April 1878. Vittorio's parents immigrated to Brazil when he was ten, together with his siblings, Giovanna and Tranquillo. His German ancestry came from his father's maternal grandfather, Carl "Carlos" Hintze, born in Hamburg around 1876, who immigrated to Brazil in 1883. His maternal grandparents were born in Lucca, in Tuscany, and went to live in Brazil in the 1890s. On 21 January 2022, his mother Olinda Bonturi Bolsonaro died at age 94. His father Percy Geraldo Bolsonaro died in 1995.

Bolsonaro spent most of his childhood moving around São Paulo with his family, living in Ribeira, Jundiaí, and Sete Barras, before settling in Eldorado, in the state's southern region, in 1966, where he grew up with his five brothers.

His first name is a tribute to Jair da Rosa Pinto, a football player for Palmeiras at the time of Bolsonaro's birth who celebrated his 34th birthday on the same day.

Military career 

In his final years in high school, Bolsonaro was admitted to the Escola Preparatória de Cadetes do Exército (the prep school of the Brazilian Army), which he entered in 1973. In 1974, he went to the Academia Militar das Agulhas Negras (Brazil's main military academy), graduating in 1977 as an artillery officer. He served in the 9th Field Artillery Group, in Nioaque, Mato Grosso do Sul. Later he studied at the Army Physical Training School in Rio de Janeiro and served in the 21st Field Artillery Group and the 8th Paratrooper Field Artillery Group, from the Paratrooper Brigade, both in the same city. His superior officers said he was "aggressive" and had "excessive ambition to get financial and economical gain". The assessment referred to Bolsonaro's attempt to mine gold in Bahia state; according to him, the activity was only a "hobby and mental hygiene". In 1987, he studied in the Officers Improvement School, where he made the Artillery Advanced Course.

Bolsonaro's first rise to publicity came in 1986 when he gave an interview to the news magazine Veja. He complained about low military salaries and claimed that the High Command was firing officers due to budgetary cuts and not because they were displaying 'deviations of conduct', as the command was telling the press. Despite being reprimanded by his superiors, Bolsonaro received praise from fellow officers and wives of military men, becoming a household name for hardliners and right-wingers who were growing disenchanted with Brazil's new civilian democratic government.

In October 1987, Bolsonaro faced a new accusation. Veja reported that, with an Army colleague, he had plans to plant bombs in military units in Rio de Janeiro. After Bolsonaro called the allegation "a fantasy", the magazine published, in its next issue, sketches in which the plan was detailed. The drawings had allegedly been made by Bolsonaro. Official records unearthed by the newspaper O Estado de S. Paulo in 2018 detailed the case. After an investigation by an administrative military bureau named Justification Board, Bolsonaro was unanimously considered guilty. According to this board, Bolsonaro had a "serious personality deviation and a professional deformation", "lack of moral courage to leave the Army" and "lied throughout the process" when denying frequent contacts with Veja. The Supreme Military Court then analyzed the case. The general in charge of reporting the case voted to acquit Bolsonaro, arguing that he had already been penalized for the initial Veja article, that there was no testimonial evidence of his plans to plant bombs, and that there were "deep contradictions in the four graphological exams", two of which failed to conclude that Bolsonaro was the author of the sketches. Bolsonaro was acquitted by the majority of the court (9v 4votes). In December 1988, just after this ruling, he left the Army to begin his political career. He served in the military for 15 years, reaching the rank of captain.

Early political career

Councilor of Rio de Janeiro (1989–1991) 

Bolsonaro entered politics in 1988, elected city councilor in Rio de Janeiro, representing the Christian Democratic Party (PDC). According to the biography by his son Flávio, Bolsonaro "was a candidate for councilor because it happened to be the only option he had at the moment to avoid persecution by some superiors. His entry into politics happened by chance, for his desire was to continue in his military career".

He spent only two years in the Municipal Chamber of Rio de Janeiro. He was described as a quiet, discreet and conservative councilor, and showed little participation. His term as councilor was used mainly to give visibility to military causes, such as retirement benefits for former officers.

Federal Deputy for Rio de Janeiro (1991–2018) 
In the 1990 elections, Bolsonaro was elected a federal deputy for the Christian Democratic Party. He served seven consecutive terms, from 1991 to 2018. He has been affiliated with several other Brazilian political parties over the years. In 2014, he was the congressman who gained the most votes in Rio de Janeiro, with 465,000.

His name was listed on the "", a list detailing a money laundering scheme where money was funneled through the state-owned electricity company Eletrobras Furnas, to politicians' campaigns.

He received housing assistance for deputies who do not have residences in Brasilia despite having an apartment in the southwest of Brasilia. He has later admitted that he considers this practice of his “immoral.” He has also been accused of engaging in fuel allowance fraud.

In his 27 years of service in the Brazilian National Congress, he put forward one constitutional amendment and at least 171 bills, two of which became law. Bolsonaro, who claims to be persecuted by the left-wing parties, said most congressmen do not vote according to their agenda, but "by who the author of the bill is".

In January 2018, Bolsonaro abandoned the Social Christian Party and switched to the Social Liberal Party (PSL). After his arrival, the PSL adopted conservative and right-wing positions, and its social liberal group Livres announced its departure from the PSL.

Presidential campaign (2018) 

On 22 July 2018, the PSL nominated Bolsonaro for president in the 2018 election. The Brazilian Labour Renewal Party also endorsed him. His coalition name was "Brazil above everything, God above everyone" (Brasil acima de tudo, Deus acima de todos). Though contested by two lawsuits, the Superior Electoral Court of Brazil deferred them and his candidacy was made official on 6August. In August, Bolsonaro announced that Antônio Hamilton Mourão, a retired army general, would be his running mate.

According to political pundits, Bolsonaro moderated his tone early in the campaign, taking a less aggressive and confrontational style. Economically, he started to support less government intervention in the economy (in contrast to the past, when he defended developmentalist policies). On the other hand, he maintained his tough stance on crime and his defense of "traditional family values". Bolsonaro also said he planned to cut taxes across the board, particularly on inheritances and businesses, to generate growth and tackle unemployment. He also promised more austerity measures and cuts in government spending, but had difficulty naming the areas where he would make cuts. He also said he would work to diminish the federal government's size and bureaucracy by enacting a wide variety of deregulation measures. Bolsonaro's promises to restore security amid record high crime and to stamp out Brazil's rampant political corruption won him huge popular support. In October, he announced he would name liberal economist Paulo Guedes as his finance minister.

On 9 August 2018, Bolsonaro attended the first presidential debate of the year, organized by the TV network Rede Bandeirantes. A week later, there was another debate at RedeTV!. On 28 August, he gave an interview to Jornal Nacional, Brazil's highest-rated primetime news program, at Rede Globo.

Bolsonaro was the first presidential candidate to raise over R$1 million in donations from the public during the 2018 campaign. In the first 59 days, he amassed an average of R$17,000 per day.

After the Workers' Party candidate Luiz Inácio Lula da Silva was arrested in April 2018, Bolsonaro became the frontrunner according to all major opinion polls. A Datafolha poll from September showed Bolsonaro as the leading candidate in the first round with 28% of vote intentions, though runoff scenarios showed him losing to Geraldo Alckmin, Fernando Haddad, and Ciro Gomes and tying with Marina Silva. Another Datafolha poll, conducted the week before election day, showed a considerable surge for Bolsonaro, who had 40% of vote intentions, or 36% when null or blank vote intentions were included. Haddad came in second with 25% and Gomes third with 15%.

The first round of the election occurred on 7October 2018. Bolsonaro finished in first place with 46% of the popular vote (49.2 million). Since he failed to win over 50%, he faced the second-place finisher, Haddad, in a runoff held on 28 October 2018.

After the first round, when his victory looked certain, Bolsonaro gave a speech by videolink to thousands of supporters who gathered at Paulista Avenue, in São Paulo. In the speech, he threatened to arrest, purge or kill "reds" and "petralhas" (a derogatory term for Workers' Party members), and promised that members of the social movements MST and MTST would be treated as "terrorists". He said: "This time, the clean-up will be even greater. This group ["reds"], if they want to stay, will have to abide by our laws... These red outlaws will be banned from our homeland. Either they go overseas, or they go to jail... Petralhada, you all go to the edge of the beach. It will be a cleaning never seen in the history of Brazil". The "edge of the beach", a Bolsonaro aide later confirmed, was a reference to a Navy base at Restinga da Marambaia, in Rio de Janeiro State, where the Brazilian military dictatorship tortured and killed dissidents. The speech was widely condemned by rivals, journalists and politicians.

Bolsonaro won the runoff election with 55.13% of the votes, and was elected the 38th president of Brazil. He took office on 1January 2019.

During the campaign, academics repeatedly raised concerns about the consequences of Bolsonaro's rise for Brazilian democracy. In the news magazine Foreign Policy, Federico Finchelstein, a historian at the New School for Social Research who specializes in fascism, wrote, "Bolsonaro's vocabulary recalls the rhetoric behind Nazi policies of persecution and victimization. But does sounding like a Nazi make him a Nazi? Insomuch as he believes in holding elections, he is not there yet. However, things could change quickly if he gains power." Jason Stanley, a Yale philosopher who has published widely on Nazism, said that Bolsonaro "uses more tactics associated to fascism than [the] American president Donald Trump". Harvard's Steven Levitsky said that Bolsonaro "is clearly authoritarian", but not a fascist. Similar concerns were raised by analysts in Portugal and Brazil. Others, such as Marxist historian Perry Anderson, dismissed the "fascist" and "populist" labels altogether.

Another highly controversial aspect of the campaign was the alleged use of illegal digital communication strategies by some of Bolsonaro's most important financial supporters. According to an investigation by Folha de S.Paulo, one of Brazil's bestselling newspapers, "Bolsonaro has been getting an illegal helping hand from a group of Brazilian entrepreneurs who are bankrolling a campaign to bombard WhatsApp users with fake news about Haddad." The suspicions led to a formal investigation by electoral authorities and the Federal Police; Bolsonaro and allies denied any wrongdoing. Another controversial point was that Taíse Feijó, an adviser in Bolsonaro's government, was among those paid to feed fake news to his supporters.

Stabbing attack during campaign 

Bolsonaro was stabbed in the abdomen on 6September 2018 while campaigning and interacting with supporters in Juiz de Fora, Minas Gerais. At first, his son Flávio Bolsonaro stated that his father's wounds were only superficial and he was recovering in the hospital, but he later said the wounds seemed worse than initially thought and his father most likely would not be able to start campaigning personally before the end of the first round. He tweeted about his father's condition, explaining that the perforation had reached parts of the liver, lung, and intestine. He also said that Bolsonaro had lost a large amount of blood, arriving at the hospital with severe hypotension (his blood pressure was 10/3, equivalent to 100/30 mmHg), but that he had since stabilized. The attack was condemned by most of the other candidates in the presidential race, and by then president Michel Temer. The day after the attack, Bolsonaro was transferred to the Albert Einstein Israelite Hospital in São Paulo, after a request from his family. According to the doctors, he was in an "extremely stable" condition.

Police arrested the attacker and identified him as Adélio Bispo de Oliveira, who, according to security agents, claimed he was on "a mission from God". He had been a member of the Socialism and Liberty Party from 2007 to 2014. His social media posts included political criticisms of both Bolsonaro and Temer. But an initial Federal Police investigation concluded that Adélio had no help from political organizations and acted alone. A medical report produced for a second investigation concluded that Bispo is mentally disturbed, having a "permanent paranoid delusional disorder" which, according to Brazilian law, prevents him from being considered legally liable for his actions. In a May 2019 decision, the Federal Court found Bispo not liable. Bolsonaro did not appeal the decision.

On 29 September, a month after the attack, Bolsonaro was released from the hospital and returned to his home in Rio de Janeiro. His condition prevented him from returning to the campaign trail for the remainder of the first round of the presidential election.

The first federal police investigation into the attack concluded that the attacker acted alone, but the investigation "leaves out many issues". Bolsonaro said he did not observe "any effort by former minister Sergio Moro to resolve the matter." Joaquim de Carvalho has said that the police left out of their investigation the search for information by a mastermind of the attack or even a self-attack. For this, expert medical examination of Bolsonaro and review of the medical records would be needed.

Personal motto 
Bolsonaro's personal motto, which he established in 2016, is John 8:32: "The truth will set you free".

Protests 

The same weekend he left the hospital, thousands of people took the streets in dozens of cities in Brazil to protest against Bolsonaro and his political stances, chanting "" ("Not him"). There were also rallies in support of the candidate in sixteen states.

Presidency (2019–2022) 

Bolsonaro was sworn in as President of the Republic on 1January 2019, succeeding Michel Temer. Bolsonaro began to get his cabinet together before his inauguration, choosing economist Paulo Guedes as his Economy minister and astronaut Marcos Pontes as his Science and Technology minister. Bolsonaro initially said his cabinet would be composed of 15 members; this figure later rose to 22 when he announced his final minister, Ricardo Salles, in December. His predecessor, Michel Temer, had a cabinet of 29 members.

Bolsonaro's initial cabinet was composed of 16 ministers, two cabinet-level positions, and four presidential secretaries, including Chief of Staff Onyx Lorenzoni. Bolsonaro's ministers included Operation Car Wash judge Sérgio Moro as Justice minister and congresswoman Tereza Cristina as minister of Agriculture.

Early in his administration, Bolsonaro focused primarily on domestic and economic issues, ranging from tax reform to changes in social security, but he faced an uphill battle with Congress. Bolsonaro stripped the indigenous affairs agency FUNAI of the responsibility to identify and demarcate indigenous lands, arguing that those territories have tiny, isolated populations who would be controlled by NPOs, and proposed to integrate them into the larger Brazilian society. Critics feared that such integration would force Brazilian Amerindians to suffer cultural assimilation. Argentine President Mauricio Macri was the first foreign leader Bolsonaro received on a state visit to Brasília after he became president.

The second inauguration of Nicolás Maduro in Venezuela took place nine days after Bolsonaro's inauguration. The disputed results of the 2018 Venezuelan presidential election led to the Venezuelan presidential crisis, as the National Assembly rejected the results, considered Maduro an illegitimate ruler since his first term of office ended, and appointed Juan Guaidó as acting president. Bolsonaro did not attend Maduro's inauguration and recognized Guaidó as the legitimate ruler of Venezuela, alongside Mauricio Macri from Argentina and Donald Trump from the US, among others. He said that "We will continue doing everything possible to re-establish order, democracy and freedom there".

After his first year in power, Bolsonaro's popularity steadily declined. A Datafolha survey, published on 21 May 2019, showed that 34% of respondents described Bolsonaro's administration as "great or good"; 26% as "regular", 36% as "bad or awful", while 4% did not respond. This was the first time more Brazilians rejected the politics of Bolsonaro than affirmed it. Meanwhile, after allegations of campaign-finance fraud, Bolsonaro fired Gustavo Bebianno, a top adviser and general secretary for the president. His party was accused of diverting public campaign funds to candidates who did not run for office.

In November 2019, Bolsonaro left the Social Liberal Party due to conflicts with its leadership. He attempted to form his own party, Alliance for Brazil, but it failed to gather enough signatures to register at the Superior Electoral Court for the 2020 Brazilian municipal elections or the 2022 Brazilian general election, leaving Bolsonaro without a party until 2021.

Throughout the COVID-19 pandemic in Brazil, Bolsonaro and his administration were accused of downplaying the crisis while the number of Brazilians infected by the virus climbed exponentially by mid-2020. Bolsonaro claimed that COVID-19 is no deadlier than "the flu" and that his priority was the nation's economic recovery rather than the health crisis. In fact, as of early 2021, the Brazilian economy was bouncing back, albeit somewhat slowly and inconsistently, as the pandemic was still threatening to undo any economic recovery. Bolsonaro continually accused political opponents and the press of exaggerating the threat of the virus and called it a "fantasy" created by the media.

In August 2020, in the middle of the pandemic, Bolsonaro's approval rating showed signs of recovery, reaching its highest level since his inauguration. In November 2020, he said he would not take a COVID vaccine if it became available, but he later said he would support any possible vaccine if the Brazilian Health Agency deemed it safe. In the same broadcast, he called face masks "the last taboo to fall".

In 2020, the Organized Crime and Corruption Reporting Project (OCCRP), an international non-governmental organization that investigates crime and corruption, gave Bolsonaro its Person of the Year Award, which "recognizes the individual who has done the most in the world to advance organized criminal activity and corruption". Bolsonaro received the award for "surrounding himself with corrupt figures, using propaganda to promote his populist agenda, undermining the justice system, and waging a destructive war against the Amazon region that has enriched some of the country's worst land owners."

In early 2021, Bolsonaro's approval ratings fell again, mostly due to the government's response to the COVID-19 pandemic, vaccination controversies, and the concurrent economic crisis that evolved under his watch. Days after Brazil surpassed Russia as the country worst hit by COVID, Bolsonaro held a political rally in Brasília; while surrounded by supporters and his own security guards, who were wearing masks, he did not. In June 2021, nationwide protests erupted against Bolsonaro's response to the pandemic; in São Paulo alone there were estimated to be 100,000 protesters on the streets. In July, YouTube removed videos posted by Bolsonaro for spreading false information about the virus. YouTube has reportedly removed 15 videos altogether; one that was removed had shown Brazil's former health minister, Eduardo Pazuello, comparing the virus to HIV. In other videos, Bolsonaro criticized efforts to stop the spread of the virus, such as wearing masks or taking the vaccine.

By the end of June 2021, more members of the opposition started to call for his impeachment over his handling of the pandemic and spreading misinformation. The opposition signed a document with multiple accusations, such as blaming Bolsonaro for the deaths of 500,000 Brazilians from COVID-19, stating that his government had blatantly turned down expert advice on tackling the virus, and at least 20 other grievances.

In July 2021, Bolsonaro claimed on Brazilian radio that his government's greatest achievement was "two and a half years without corruption". In the same month, a scandal dubbed "vaccine-gate" emerged. After months of denying offers of vaccines and bartering the costs, Bolsonaro's government made a deal to buy the unapproved Covaxin vaccine from the Indian company Bharat Biotech at a very high price. It was found that the government allegedly paid ten times the amount agreed by Bharat Biotech for the vaccine and that the irregularities were not found in the prices of the vaccines, but in a payment of $45 million to a company in Singapore. In response, the Brazilian Supreme Court authorized a criminal investigation of Bolsonaro.

In March 2021, Bolsonaro replaced Defense Minister Fernando Azevedo e Silva with Walter Souza Braga Netto; like Bolsonaro, Netto lionized the 1964–1985 military dictatorship in Brazil. A day later, the leaders of the army, air force, and navy all resigned. In April, Bolsonaro declared that the Brazilian armed forces would "go into the streets" if he ordered them. In mid-August, the military conducted a ten-minute tank parade in Brasília, with Bolsonaro in attendance. The parade had been held annually in the last 30 years, but tanks had never been sent to the capital before. The parade was announced only a day in advance, and passed by the national congressional building, where lawmakers were due to vote on Bolsonaro's proposed election-related changes hours later. The lawmakers ultimately rejected the changes.

On 28 July 2021, Bolsonaro appointed Ciro Noguiera, a senator who was implicated in the Odebrecht corruption case, as his chief of staff.

In early August 2021, Bolsonaro threatened to respond with unconstitutional measures to an investigation of his baseless allegations of fraud vulnerabilities in Brazil's electronic voting system, because he deemed that investigation unconstitutional. Brazilian Supreme Court Justice Alexandre de Moraes had approved the investigation. In mid-August 2021, Bolsonaro warned of a potential "institutional rupture", while urging the Brazilian Senate to charge de Moraes and another Supreme Court Judge, Luis Roberto Barroso, the leader of the electoral court.

On 26 October 2021, a senate committee approved a report calling for Bolsonaro to face criminal charges, including crimes against humanity, for his handling of the COVID-19 pandemic.

Without a political party, Bolsonaro began to negotiate the entrance to one in preparation for the 2022 Brazilian general election (as the 1988 Brazilian Constitution does not allow independent politicians). He negotiated with the Progressistas (PP), of which he was a member from 1995 to 2003 and from 2005 to 2016, and the Social Christian Party (PSC), of which he was a member from 2016 to 2018, the Brazilian Labour Party (PTB), Brazilian Woman's Party (PMB), Christian Democracy (DC), Party of National Mobilization (PMN), the Republicans and Patriot (PATRI).

On 30 November 2021, Bolsonaro and his son Senator Flávio Bolsonaro joined the Liberal Party (PL). According to political analysts, the choice represents the consolidation of the alliance of Bolsonaro with the Centrão, a large bloc of parties without consistent ideological orientation that supports different sides of the political spectrum to gain political privileges—PL being one of them. Bolsonaro previously made deals with the Centrão for support in Congress.

On 23 June 2022, Bolsonaro defended his former Minister of Education, Milton Ribeiro, after the latter was arrested on corruption charges.

2022 presidential election

In a runoff presidential election on 30 October, Bolsonaro was defeated by former president Luiz Inácio Lula da Silva, who took 50.9% of the votes cast. Lula had won the most votes in the first round of the election on 2 October, receiving 48.43% of the votes cast: Bolsonaro received 43.20%.

In a press conference at the Palácio da Alvorada on 1 November, Bolsonaro did not acknowledge his defeat but stated that he would "comply with the Constitution". Regarding the protests by his supporters, he referred to them as "the fruit of indignation and a sense of injustice of how the electoral process unfolded", while calling on them to remain peaceful and not block roads. Shortly after his speech, the Supreme Court stated that by authorizing the transition of power he had recognized the results, paving the way for the transition two days after Lula was recognized as the winner.

Bolsonaro left for the United States on 30 December to avoid taking part in the swearing-in ceremony of Lula, leaving Vice President Hamilton Mourão as the acting President.

Post-presidency (2023–present)
Bolsonaro arrived in Florida before his term ended, and has since resided in Kissimmee, near Disney World in Orlando. On 8 January 2023, his supporters attacked the buildings of the Supreme Court of Brazil, the National Congress of Brazil and the Planalto Presidential Palace in an attempt to instigate a military coup d'état and reinstate Bolsonaro as president. While the riots were going on, President Lula blamed Bolsonaro in a press conference. Bolsonaro eventually condemned the protesters in a tweet, but denied responsibility.

In February 2023, Bolsonaro announced that he would be returning to Brazil in March. This would be the first time Bolsonaro returns to the country he ruled since before the 2022 election. Bolsonaro had entered the United States on a diplomatic visa which expired on the 31st of January, but the family applied for tourist visas to extend their stay in Florida.

Political positions 

Bolsonaro's political views have been described as nationalist and populist in nature, and he himself as an advocate of far-right policies. His supporters, however, claim that his views are more aligned with traditional right-wing conservatism. His electorate is mainly formed by adults above the age of 34, the working middle to upper class (mainly in the southeast region of the country), conservatives in general, college graduates, some centrists and the Christian right. According to some polls, Bolsonaro's main support comes from the southeast, central-west and south regions of Brazil. His voters are usually male and white, with a noticeable gender gap, with Bolsonaro polling poorly among female voters (mustering only 18% support with this demographic). Just before the 2018 election, however, it was reported that female support for him had risen to 27%.

Bolsonaro is viewed as a pro-life, anti-establishment and pro-gun politician, voicing opposition to most forms of gun control legislation, arguing that law-abiding citizens have the right to self-defense, especially those living in rural areas. According to The Washington Post, "Homicides hit a record high of 63,880 last year [...] Bolsonaro's solution is zero tolerance. He has called for police to use more lethal force and wants to relax gun laws so that average citizens can defend themselves." Bolsonaro often rejects accusations made against him of misogyny and homophobia, and says he is not "far-right", but simply right-wing.

Jair Bolsonaro is known for his strong opposition to left-wing policies. Most notably, he has been a vocal opponent of same-sex marriage, environmental regulations, abortion, affirmative action (particularly racial quotas), immigration (particularly from Haiti, Africa and the Middle East, which he once called "the scum of humanity"), drug liberalization, land reforms, and secularism at the federal level, among other things. He has also made statements in defense of the Brazilian military regime (a dictatorship known for constant human rights violations). He argues that torture is a "legitimate practice" and says that he would try to pass new legislation regarding the introduction of life imprisonment to the Brazilian penal code. Bolsonaro supports the privatization of state-owned companies and advocates free market policies, although critics have stated that his policy-making record does not in fact show him to be a supporter of economic liberalism.

In a 2017 interview with journalist Claudio Dantas Sequeira from O Antagonista, Bolsonaro said that his views are directly aligned with the centrist to right-wing United States citizens' views on gun ownership, abortion, gender politics, and trade, despite the "left-leaning media frenzy" against him. He reiterated that he intends to reverse some disarmament laws, improve public security, and also improve trade ties with the United States, which he said were broken during Lula da Silva's and Dilma Rousseff's administrations.

Bolsonaro has, during his long political career, expressed views regarded as being far-right. He has made statements that some people considered insulting, homophobic, violence-inciting, misogynistic, sexist, racist or anti-refugee. Other controversial political stances expressed by Bolsonaro have been the defense of the death penalty (which is currently banned under the Constitution of Brazil of 1988) and of radical interventionism in Brazil by the military, along with an imposition of a Brazilian military government.

Journalist Glenn Greenwald called Bolsonaro "the most misogynistic, hateful elected official in the democratic world". News.com.au wondered whether Bolsonaro was "the world's most repulsive politician". British news magazine The Economist referred to him as a "radical", "religious nationalist", a "right-wing demagogue", and "apologist of dictators". Federico Finchelstein, scholar on fascism and populism, has considered Bolsonaro, as he would link violence to austerity and neoliberal economic ideas, to be the most similar leader to Augusto Pinochet to come out from the young South American democracies.

Bolsonaro is an open admirer of former U.S. President Donald Trump. During Bolsonaro's campaign, some observers saw similarities between the two's ideals, hardline attacks and a reputation for incendiary rhetoric, as well as social media presence. Because of this, Bolsonaro has been called the Brazilian equivalent of Trump or the "Trump of the Tropics".

Honorific order given to Olavo de Carvalho 
On 1 May 2019, Bolsonaro awarded the Brazilian conservative writer and far-right conspiracy theorist Olavo de Carvalho the Order of Rio Branco honorific order. Carvalho, who wrote books about leftist politics in Brazil and modern issues in general, was openly admired by Bolsonaro and sarcastically called by journalists his guru.

Carvalho was sometimes harshly critical of Bolsonaro, even calling him "dumb".

Views on the Brazilian military dictatorship 

Throughout his political career, Bolsonaro has made several admiring comments about the U.S.–supported Brazilian military dictatorship which ruled the country from 1964 to 1985. He said in 1993, eight years after the return of democracy, that the military regime had "led to a more sustainable and prosperous Brazil". Bolsonaro has publicly referred to the military dictatorship as a "glorious" period in Brazil's history, and that under the military dictatorship, Brazil enjoyed "20 years of order and progress". In December 2008, Bolsonaro said that "the error of the dictatorship was that it tortured, but did not kill".

Bolsonaro has also repeatedly made admiring comments about a number of other Latin American dictatorships. He praised Peruvian president Alberto Fujimori as a role model for his use of military intervention via self-coup against the judiciary and legislature. In a 1998 interview with Veja magazine, Bolsonaro praised the Chilean dictatorship of Augusto Pinochet, and said the Pinochet regime, which killed over 3,000 Chilean citizens, "should have killed more people". In 1999, Bolsonaro said that Hugo Chávez represented "hope for Latin America", comments that became a matter of controversy during the 2018 campaign, when Bolsonaro presented himself as a harsh critic of Chavismo. In 2019, already in power, Bolsonaro commended Paraguayan dictator Alfredo Stroessner as a "visionary" and "statesman", drawing immediate criticism, particularly due to multiple allegations of pedophilia against Stroessner.

Speaking before his vote in favor of President Dilma Rousseff's impeachment amid the massive corruption scandal, Bolsonaro paid homage to Colonel Brilhante Ustra, an agent of Brazil's military dictatorship, and announced on the floor of the Chamber of Deputies that he was dedicating his pro-impeachment vote to Ustra's memory. Ustra had headed the DOI-CODI torture unit where Rousseff was allegedly tortured during the military dictatorship. Left-wing deputy Jean Wyllys spat at him after his statement during the same session. The congressman claimed to have suffered homophobic offenses from Jair Bolsonaro and his allies.

In a TV interview with Câmera Aberta in the 1990s, Bolsonaro said that if he ever became president, he would use this as an opportunity to shut down the National Congress and instigate a military coup himself. , he appeared to have changed his mind, and said that if someone becomes the head of the country, it would be through voting.

In March 2019, Bolsonaro stated that the 1964 coup d'état that overthrew President João Goulart was not a coup, and that 31 March, the day the coup was installed, should be "properly commemorated".

Foreign policy 

During the 2018 presidential campaign, Bolsonaro said he would make considerable changes to Brazil's foreign relations, saying that the "Itamaraty needs to be in service of the values that were always associated with the Brazilian people". He also said that the country should stop "praising dictators" and attacking democracies, such as the United States, Israel and Italy. In early 2018, he affirmed that his "trip to the five democratic countries the United States, Israel, Japan, South Korea, and Taiwan showed who we will be and we would like to join good people". Bolsonaro showed distrust towards China throughout the presidential campaign claiming they "[want to] buy Brazil", although Brazil recorded a US$20 billion trade surplus with China in 2018, and China is only the 13th largest source of foreign direct investment into Brazil. Bolsonaro said he wished to continue to do business with the Chinese but he also said that Brazil should "make better [economic] deals" with other countries, with no "ideological agenda" behind it. His stance towards China has also been interpreted by some as an attempt to curry favor with the Trump administration to garner concessions from the US. However, Bolsonaro mostly changed his position on China after he took office, saying that the two countries were "born to walk together" during his visit to Beijing in October 2019. He also said that Brazil would stay out of the ongoing China-U.S. trade war. According to Oliver Stuenkel, Bolsonaro's stance on global politics evolved from anti-China to anti-Western during his presidency.

Bolsonaro said that his first international trip as president would be to Israel. Bolsonaro also said that the State of Palestine "is not a country, so there should be no embassy here", adding that "you don't negotiate with terrorists." The announcement was warmly received by the prime minister of Israel, Benjamin Netanyahu, who welcomed Bolsonaro to Israel in March 2019 during the final weeks of a re-election campaign, but was met with condemnation from the Arab League, which warned Bolsonaro it could damage diplomatic ties. "I love Israel," Bolsonaro said in Hebrew at a welcoming ceremony, with Netanyahu at his side, at Tel Aviv's Ben-Gurion airport.

Bolsonaro also praised U.S. President Donald Trump and his foreign policy, and has been called "the tropical Trump". His son Eduardo has indicated that Brazil should distance itself from Iran, sever ties with Nicolás Maduro's government in Venezuela and relocate Brazil's embassy in Israel to Jerusalem. Bolsonaro is widely considered the most pro-American candidate in Brazil since the 1980s. PSL members said that if elected, he would dramatically improve relations between the United States and Brazil. During an October 2017 campaign rally in Miami, he saluted the American flag and led chants of "USA! USA!" to a large crowd. U.S. National Security Advisor John Bolton praised Bolsonaro as a "like-minded" partner and said his victory was a "positive sign" for Latin America. Bolsonaro had a fractious relationship with U.S. President Joe Biden, and subsequently deepened ties with Russia, emphasising his neutrality over the 2022 Russian invasion of Ukraine.

At the regional level, Bolsonaro praised Argentine President Mauricio Macri for ending the 12-year rule of Néstor and Cristina Fernández de Kirchner, which he saw as similar to Lula and Rousseff. Although he does not have plans to leave the Mercosur, he criticized it for prioritizing ideological issues over economic ones. A staunch anti-communist, Bolsonaro has condemned Cuba's former leader Fidel Castro and the current regime in that island.

Bolsonaro praised British Prime Minister Winston Churchill, saying that he had learned from Churchill: "Patriotism, love for your fatherland, respect for your flag – something that has been lost over the last few years here in Brazil... and governing through example, especially at that difficult moment of the Second World War." Bolsonaro said he's open to the possibility of hosting a U.S. military base in Brazil to counter Russian influence in the region. With the intention to persuade Trump to make Brazil a NATO member in March 2019, Bolsonaro said: "the discussions with the United States will begin in the coming months". 

With formal U.S. support for Brazil's entry to OECD in May 2019, Bolsonaro said, "currently, all 36 members of the organization support the entry of the country, fruit of confidence in the new Brazil being built, more free, open and fair". In October 2019, on a state visit to China, he announced the end of the need for visas for Chinese and Indian entry into Brazil. Brazil had already removed the need for visas for people from the U.S., Canada, Japan, and Australia.

Environment and climate change 

Brazil has the world's largest tropical rainforest in the Amazon basin. According to The Washington Post, "Bolsonaro is a powerful supporter of agribusiness [...] and is likely to favor profits over preservation. [...] Bolsonaro has chafed at foreign pressure to safeguard the Amazon rainforest, and he served notice to international nonprofit groups such as the World Wide Fund for Nature that he will not tolerate their agendas in Brazil. He has also come out strongly against lands reserved for indigenous tribes. Bolsonaro advisers additionally say that he plans to expand nuclear and hydroelectric power into the Amazon."

Bolsonaro rejects the scientific consensus on climate change. He repeatedly threatened to withdraw from the Paris Agreement during his campaign. Even before taking office, he backed out of Brazil's offer to host the 2019 UN Climate Change Conference. Ernesto Araújo, the new Minister of Foreign Affairs appointed by Bolsonaro, has called global warming a plot by "cultural Marxists" and eliminated the Climate Change Division of the ministry. Two departments of the Ministry of the Environment dealing with climate change in Brazil and mitigation and one dealing with deforestation were also eliminated.

In April 2019, the American Museum of Natural History canceled an event honoring Bolsonaro after facing heavy public criticism, including from New York Mayor Bill de Blasio. The museum's directorate justified its decision in a statement, "With mutual respect for the work and goals of our organizations, we jointly agreed that the Museum is not the optimal location for the Brazilian-Am. Chamber of Commerce gala dinner. This traditional event will go forward at another location on the original date and time." Bolsonaro supported plans to open the Reserva Nacional do Cobre e Associados (Renca) Amazonian reserve in Brazil's northern states of Pará and Amapá to commercial mining.

Destruction of the Amazon rainforest increased by 88% for the month of June 2019, during Bolsonaro's first year as president, as compared with the previous year, according to the National Institute for Space Research (INPE). Bolsonaro rejected the agency's data as false. The INPE director was fired after he rebutted Bolsonaro's criticism of the institute. The Bolsonaro administration decreased government efforts to combat illegal logging, ranching and mining in the Amazon. Government enforcement actions such as fines, warnings and the confiscation or destruction of illegal equipment in protected areas decreased by 20% in the first half of 2018 compared to the first half of 2017.

Christianity and secularism 

Bolsonaro is a member of the Catholic Church (while his wife and one of his sons are Evangelical Christians) and is registered as one with the Superior Electoral Court. In 2016, he had himself baptised along with three of his sons Flávio, Carlos and Eduardo in the Jordan River by a Pentecostal church. Sociologist Christina Vital of the Fluminense Federal University stated that this act was more than an expression of conversion to Evangelicalism and was meant to create an ambiguous religious identity, through which the Bolsonaro family could appeal to the various groups of voters.

He is reported to have attended a Baptist church for 10 years. In a 2017 speech, Bolsonaro stated, "God above everything. There is no such thing as a secular state. The state is Christian, and any minority that is against this has to change, if they can." He later evolved his position to keeping the country a secular state during the first round of the Brazilian presidential elections: "We are going to make a government for everyone, regardless of religion. Even for atheists. We have almost 5% of atheists in Brazil, and they have the same needs that others have."

Views on women 
In an interview with Zero Hora in 2015, Bolsonaro argued that men and women should not receive the same salaries, because women get pregnant, adding that he believes federal law mandating paid maternity leave harms work productivity. Bolsonaro has denied saying that women should receive less than men; he claims it was statistical data by IBGE.

In a public speech in April 2017, Bolsonaro said he had five children, that the first four were male and that for the fifth he produced a daughter out of "a moment of weakness".

Bolsonaro provoked controversy for a series of remarks made to and about Federal Deputy and former Human Rights Minister Maria do Rosário. During a Congressional debate, Bolsonaro said that minors should be treated as adults if they commit heinous crimes such as murder or rape, to which Maria do Rosário responded by calling him a "rapist". Bolsonaro then stated that Congresswoman Rosário was "not worth raping; she is very ugly". The remarks drew considerable condemnation throughout Brazil. In the aftermath of these remarks, Bolsonaro was tried and convicted in a Federal court in September 2015 on counts of hedonic damages against Rosário. In June 2016, the Federal Supreme Court responded to a complaint filed by the Attorney General and decided to open two criminal actions against Bolsonaro. The Supreme Court ruled that he had potentially incited rape and defamed the honor of his fellow Deputy. He faced a penalty of up to six months of jail and a fine. Ultimately in August 2017, an appellate court upheld a lower court's verdict which found Bolsonaro guilty and sentenced him to pay a fine to Rosário of R$10,000 (roughly equivalent to US$2,500). This lawsuit was dismissed by the Supreme Federal Court as Bolsonaro was inaugurated as president in 2019 and acquired immunity from prosecution.

Views on homosexuality 

In May 2002, after then-President Fernando Henrique Cardoso attended a pro-gay-marriage gathering, Bolsonaro said, "If I see two men kissing in the street, I will beat them." He later publicly defended beating gay children, saying, "If your child starts to become like that, a little bit gay, you take a whip and you change their behavior." He also said, "If a kid hangs out with someone who uses marijuana, he'll end up snorting, and if he hangs out with gay person, he definitely is going to turn into a faggot."

In a June 2011 interview with Playboy, Bolsonaro said, "I would be incapable of loving a gay son", and added that he would prefer any gay son of his "to die in an accident".

In an interview that same month with Jornal de Notícias, Bolsonaro linked homosexuality to pedophilia, saying, "many of the children who are adopted by gay couples will be abused by these couples". He further argued that Brazil does not need legislation specifically targeting homophobia, because "most homosexuals are murdered by their respective pimps at hours when good citizens are already asleep".

In British actor Stephen Fry's 2013 documentary Out There, Bolsonaro said, "no father is ever proud of having a gay son" and "we Brazilians do not like homosexuals".

In a March 2016 video interview for Vice with Elliot Page, an openly lesbian actress at the time, Page asked Bolsonaro whether he should have been beaten as a child (alluding to Bolsonaro's public statements that gay children should be beaten). Bolsonaro replied, "You are very nice. If I were a cadet in the military academy and saw you on the street, I would whistle at you. All right? You are very pretty." Bolsonaro added, "Over time, due to liberal habits, drugs, with women also working, the number of homosexuals has really increased."

On 9 November 2017, the Court of Justice for the State of Rio de Janeiro sentenced Bolsonaro to pay a fine of R$150,000 for hate speech because of televised comments he made in 2011 to the CQC TV program, when Bolsonaro stated that "there is no risk" of his family producing a homosexual child because his children had a "good education". Judge Luciana Teixeira said that the deputy had abused his right of free expression to commit a wrongful act. "You cannot deliberately attack and humiliate, ignoring the principles of equality, just because you invoke freedom of expression," said the judge.

However, on 11 January 2016, when he began to present himself as a pre-candidate to the Presidency of Brazil, Bolsonaro began to moderate his discourse on gay people by publishing a video on his official YouTube channel:

I have nothing to do with anyone's behavior. If the man and the woman later decide to live with their partner, to form a couple, to live with a same-sex person, go and be happy. But we cannot admit that, by our omission in the Parliament, children become homosexuals in the future, or have such homosexual behavior in the future, by the influence of school. That is inadmissible. 

Since then, Bolsonaro states he has nothing against gays and that he fights only the "gay kit" in schools. On 4October 2018, for example, Bolsonaro said:

Each person, after a certain age, owner of their acts, will take care of their life. For six-year-old children, it cannot be. A father does not want to come home and see his son playing with a doll by the influence of school. Homosexuals will be happy if I become president.

That same month, shortly before the first round of the Brazilian presidential elections, he said: "We are going to make a government for everybody. For gays, and some gays are fathers, who are mothers. It is a work for everyone". After being elected president, when asked by William Bonner in the Jornal Nacional about what he would say to those who are more prejudiced and aggressive against gays, Bolsonaro replied: "The aggression against a fellow man has to be punished in the way of law. And if [such aggression is committed] for a reason like this, you have to have your sentence increased."

Views on political violence 

On multiple occasions, Bolsonaro has publicly endorsed physical violence as a legitimate and necessary form of political action. In 1999, when he was 44 years old and a representative in the Brazilian Congress, Bolsonaro said during a TV interview that the only way of "changing" Brazil was by "killing thirty thousand people, beginning with Fernando Henrique Cardoso" (then President of Brazil). During the 2018 campaign, he stated during a rally in Acre that the local "petralhas" (a derogatory term for members of the Workers' Party) would be "shot"; according to his aides, the statement was a "joke". One week before the second round, Bolsonaro said during a speech that in his administration "petralhas" and "reds" (i.e. leftists) would be arrested, purged or taken to the "corner of the beach", a term that was later revealed to mean a Navy base where dissidents of the Brazilian military dictatorship were murdered.

In 1999, talking about Chico Lopes, a former president of the Brazilian Central Bank who invoked his right to remain silent during a Congress hearing, Bolsonaro declared himself in favor of torture in this sort of situation. Asked about this phrase years later, Bolsonaro said: "Ask the father of a kidnapped child what he would like him to do to discover [where the kid is]. You have to take brutal measures, which some consider torture".

Birth control for the poor 
Bolsonaro provoked considerable controversy for public remarks made in July 2008, where he proposed to provide poor people with birth control methods, who he suggested might be too uneducated to understand family planning education. Bolsonaro said:

I wish Brazil had a family planning program. It's not even worthy to talk about education when most of these [poor] people are not prepared to receive education, therefore they won't educate themselves. Only rigid birth control can save us from chaos. An educated man and woman will hardly desire an extra child with the sole purpose of engaging in a social welfare assistance program [as it is nowadays]. We need to adopt a rigid birth control policy. We can't make demagogic speeches any longer, proposing bills and means of government to support these poor people [who] are increasingly proliferating throughout the country. [...] People who aren't prepared to have children, shouldn't have them. This is what I stand for and I'm not worried about getting votes in the future. It's past time to discuss a policy to contain this demographic explosion, otherwise, we'll keep voting in this Chamber only matters such as Bolsa Família, loans for the poor, gas vouchers, etc. Methods [of birth control] have to be provided for those who, unfortunately, are ignorant and have no means to control their offspring. Because we [as upper-middle class] can control ours. Poor people don't control [theirs].

As a Congressman, Bolsonaro put forward three bills trying to remove "virtually all" legal restrictions to surgical sterilization via the public health system, including the reduction of "the minimum age of sterilization to 21 years". None of the bills were voted through.

Elections
Bolsonaro has endorsed conspiracy theories of voter fraud in past elections, including claims that attempts were made to rig the 2018 presidential election against him; he has also questioned the outcome of the 2020 United States presidential election. During his presidency, he has repeatedly challenged the legitimacy of electronic voting and advocated the use of paper ballots in the 2022 election.

Bolsonaro has said that he will not accept the results of the 2022 election if electoral reforms are not implemented. Most experts on Brazilian politics, including Defense Minister Celso Amorim, have questioned the likelihood of a coup attempt, and polls have found that few Bolsonaro supporters would likely endorse a coup. In May 2022, Central Intelligence Agency director William Burns warned Bolsonaro against any further attacks on Brazil's electoral system. The 2022 election occurred days after the success of far-right politician Giorgia Meloni in the 2022 Italian general election, with analysts noting that Bolsonaro performed better than expected during the first round of elections and that his party's success has the potential to moderate Lula's government if Lula wins the election.

Personal life 

Bolsonaro has been married three times and has five children. His first wife was Rogéria Nantes Braga (with whom he has three sons: Flávio, Carlos and Eduardo). His second marriage was with Ana Cristina Valle (with whom he has a son, Renan). In 2007, he married his third and current wife Michelle de Paula Firmo Reinaldo (with whom he has a daughter, Laura).

While working in Congress, Bolsonaro hired Michelle as a secretary and over the next two years she received unusual promotions and her salary more than tripled. He was forced to fire her after the Supreme Federal Court ruled that nepotism is illegal in the public administration. , Bolsonaro and his wife lived in Barra da Tijuca, Rio de Janeiro.

Bolsonaro has three granddaughters, two by his son Flávio and one by his son Eduardo. Eduardo and Flávio Bolsonaro are evangelical Protestant Christians and members of the Baptist Church in Brazil.

Honours and awards

National honors 
  Grand Master and Grand Cross of the Order of Rio Branco (1 January 2019)
  Grand Master and Grand Cross of the Order of Defence Merit (8 January 2019)
  Grand Master and Grand Cross of the Order of Military Merit (16 June 2019)
  Grand Master and Grand Cross of the Order of Naval Merit (8 January 2019)
  Grand Master and Grand Cross of the Order of Aeronautical Merit (3 January 2019)
 Grand Collar of the Order of Labor Judicial Merit (13 August 2019)
  Grand Cross of the Order of Military Judicial Merit (28 March 2019)
  The Mauá Medal of Merit (15 August 2019)
  The Peacemaker Medal (5 December 2018)

Awards 
 One of Time magazine's 100 most influential people in 2019 and 2020
 Brazilian-American Chamber of Commerce's 2019 Person of the Year
 OCCRP's 2020 Person of the Year "for his role in promoting organized crime and corruption"
 On 25 October 2021, Bolsonaro was recognized as an honorary citizen by the city council of Anguillara Veneta, Italy, his paternal grandfather's hometown. This aroused reactions in Italy.

Electoral history

Presidential

Chamber of Deputies

References

Further reading 

 Amaral, Oswald E. "The Victory of Jair Bolsonaro According to the Brazilian Electoral Study of 2018." Brazilian Political Science Review (2020). 14 (1): e0004 -1/13 online
 Bloch, Agata, and Marco Vallada Lemonte. "Introduction to the Meteoric Political Rise of Brazilian President Jair Bolsonaro Under a Crisis of the 'Brazilianness'." Ameryka Łacińska. Kwartalnik Analityczno-Informacyjny 4.106 (2020): 1–22. online 
 Boito, Armando. "Reform and Political Crisis in Brazil: Class Conflicts in Workers' Party Governments and the Rise of Bolsonaro Neo-fascism." in Reform and Political Crisis in Brazil (Brill, 2021).
 Burity, Joanildo. "The Brazilian Conservative Wave, the Bolsonaro Administration, and Religious Actors." Brazilian Political Science Review 15 (2021). online
 Casarões, Guilherme et al. "Brazilian foreign policy under Jair Bolsonaro: far-right populism and the rejection of the liberal international order." Cambridge Review of International Affairs (September 2021), p1-21.
 De Sá Guimarães, Feliciano, and Irma Dutra De Oliveira E Silva. "Far-right populism and foreign policy identity: Jair Bolsonaro's ultra-conservatism and the new politics of alignment." International Affairs 97.2 (2021): 345–363. online
 Da Silva, Antonio José Bacelar, and Erika Robb Larkins. "The Bolsonaro election, antiblackness, and changing race relations in Brazil." Journal of Latin American and Caribbean Anthropology 24.4 (2019): 893–913. online
 Layton, Matthew L., et al. "Demographic polarization and the rise of the far right: Brazil's 2018 presidential election." Research & Politics 8.1 (2021): 2053168021990204. online
 Neto, Octavio Amorim, and Gabriel Alves Pimenta. "The First Year of Bolsonaro in Office: Same Old Story, Same Old Song?." Revista de Ciencia Politica 40.2 (2020): 187–213. online
 Pagliarini, Andre. "Facing Bolsonaro's Brazil: A progressive US foreign policy toward Brazil must neither defer to nor confront far-right president Jair Bolsonaro. instead, it should illuminate his antidemocratic tendencies while centering key global fights against inequality and climate change." NACLA Report on the Americas 52.1 (2020): 47–52.
 Pereira, Frederico Batista, and Felipe Nunes. "Media Choice and the Polarization of Public Opinion About Covid-19 in Brazil." Revista Latinoamericana de Opinión Pública (2021) 1–19. online

External links

 President of Brazil 
 Profile in the Chamber of Deputies

|-

|-

 
1955 births
Living people
Jair
People from São Paulo (state)
Presidents of Brazil
Members of the Chamber of Deputies (Brazil) from Rio de Janeiro (state)
Municipal Chamber of Rio de Janeiro councillors
Brazilian anti-same-sex-marriage activists
Brazilian anti-communists
Brazilian nationalists
Brazilian people of Calabrian descent
Brazilian people of German descent
Brazilian people of Italian descent
Brazilian people of Venetian descent
Brazilian Roman Catholics
Conservatism in Brazil
Critics of multiculturalism
Far-right politics in Brazil
Gun rights advocates
Male critics of feminism
Progressistas politicians
Right-wing populism in South America
Stabbing survivors
Democrats (Brazil) politicians
Democratic Social Party politicians
Liberal Party (Brazil, 2006) politicians
Reform Progressive Party politicians
Social Christian Party (Brazil) politicians
Social Liberal Party (Brazil) politicians
20th-century Brazilian politicians
21st-century Brazilian politicians
20th-century Roman Catholics
21st-century Roman Catholics